is the Japanese name for the Castlevania video game series, as it is known as worldwide. In Japan, several games within the series share the Akumajō Dracula name:
 Castlevania, the first game in the series, released for the Family Computer Disk System and the Nintendo Entertainment System.
 Vampire Killer, a parallel version of Castlevania for the MSX2
 Haunted Castle, a game that features an alternate take on the plot of Castlevania, released for arcades.
 Super Castlevania IV, a reimagining of Castlevania for the Super Nintendo Entertainment System
 Akumajō Dracula, a more direct remake of the first title, originally released for the X68000 home computer and later ported to the PlayStation as Castlevania Chronicles.